is a private university in Hokkaido, Japan, established in 1999. It has campuses in Eniwa  and Sapporo. Its junior college division is coeducational. The predecessor of the school, a women's school, was founded in 1942.

External links
 Official website 

Educational institutions established in 1942
Private universities and colleges in Japan
Universities and colleges in Hokkaido
Universities and colleges in Sapporo
1942 establishments in Japan